Aziz Democratic Workers Congress is a political party and trade union in Sri Lanka. As of 2005 the president of A.D.W.C. was Ashraf Aziz.

References

Political parties in Sri Lanka